Iran Hormoz 21 (also known as MIG-S-5000) is a class of landing ship tank (LST) or landing craft tank (LCT) operated by the Navy of the Islamic Revolutionary Guard Corps.

History 
Two of these ships were ordered to Ravestein B.V. shipyard in Deest, Netherlands for civilian use, and were built between 1984 and 1985. The Marine Industries Organization has built the class ingeniously, but all of its products are in commercial use. One was launched in mid-1995 and another in 1997.

Ships in the class
The vessels of this class in IRGC service are:

References 

Amphibious warfare vessel classes
Ship classes of the Islamic Revolutionary Guard Corps
Ships built by Marine Industries Organization
Ships built in the Netherlands